The Saint Peter and Saint Paul Archipelago is a group of 15 small islets and rocks in the central equatorial Atlantic Ocean. It lies in the Intertropical Convergence Zone, a region of the Atlantic characterized by low average winds punctuated with local thunderstorms. Administratively, the archipelago belongs to Brazil and is part of the special "state district" of Fernando de Noronha, in the state of Pernambuco, in spite of the very large distance between the two island groups and the even larger distance to the state mainland.

The islets expose serpentinized abyssal mantle peridotite and kaersutite-bearing ultramafic mylonite atop the world's highest and yet only second largest megamullion (after the Parece Vela megamullion under Okinotorishima in the Pacific Ocean). This grouping is the sole location in the Atlantic Ocean where the abyssal mantle is exposed above sea level.

In 1986, the archipelago was designated an environmentally protected area. 
This is now part of the Fernando de Noronha Environmental Protection Area.
Since 1998, the Brazilian Navy has maintained a permanently manned research facility on the islands. 
The main economic activity around the islets is tuna fishing.

History

On April 20, 1511, a Portuguese Navy fleet composed of six caravels under the command of Captain Garcia de Noronha discovered the islets by accident while on their journey to India. While navigating in the open sea late at night, the Saint Peter caravel, under the command of Captain Manuel de Castro Alcoforado, crashed against the islets. The crew was rescued by the Saint Paul caravel, forming the name given to the islets.

In December 1799, the American captain Amasa Delano landed on the islets. He spent an afternoon and one night on the rocks.

On the morning of February 16, 1832, the rocks were visited by Charles Darwin on the first leg of his voyage on HMS Beagle around the world. Darwin listed all the fauna he could find, noting that not a single plant or even a lichen could be found on the island. Darwin found two birds, a booby and a noddy, a large crab that stole the fish intended for chicks, a fly that lived on the booby and a parasitic tick. He found a moth that lived on feathers, a beetle, a woodlouse that lived on dung, and numerous spiders that he thought lived on scavengers of the waterfowl. Darwin felt that these rocks represented how life first took hold on a newly formed outcrop. Darwin was correct in noting that, unusually, these small islands were not volcanic, but were instead formed by a geologic uplift. 

The rocks, then called "St. Paul's Rocks", were visited by James Clark Ross on 29 November 1839. He was in charge of an expedition to the Antarctic regions with two vessels, HMS Erebus and HMS Terror. Robert McCormick gave some geological and biological remarks on St. Paul's Rocks in the report on the expedition.

Another famous person to visit the rocks was Ernest Shackleton, on his last expedition to Antarctica (1921–1922).

In 1942, during World War II, the islets were declared to be part of the Federal Territory of Fernando de Noronha (which also included the Rocas Atoll).

In early 1960, the rocks served as the starting-point and terminus for the first submerged circumnavigation of the world by the American nuclear-powered submarine .

In 1982 a wind anemometer with satellite telemetry reporting via GOES EAST satellite was installed by a team from Lamont-Doherty Geological Observatory with help from the Francais Ocean Climat Atlantique (FOCAL) and the Captain and crew of the N/O CAPRICORNE.  This installation was supported by National Science Foundation Grant #OCE 82-09982.

Scientific station

On June 25, 1998, the Brazilian Navy inaugurated the Saint Peter and Saint Paul Archipelago Scientific Station (ECASPSP). The station is manned with four researchers, who are rotated in and out every 15 days. By maintaining permanent occupation of the archipelago, the Brazilian Navy extends Brazil's Exclusive Economic Zone, territorial waters and airspace into the North Atlantic Ocean.

On June 5, 2006, the archipelago was shaken by an earthquake of magnitude 6.0 (with epicenter about 140 km to the east). The strong tidal surge following the earthquake caused the battery compartment to crash against the station's outer wall, allowing sea water to flood the station. The four researchers who were on the archipelago took shelter in the lighthouse, while maintaining constant contact with the Brazilian Navy. A fishing vessel located nearby rescued the researchers, who were then transferred to a Brazilian Navy patrol boat. The incident caused considerable damage to the station and equipment. The station was repaired on September 9–11, 2006, and became operational shortly after.

In 2007, the Brazilian Navy started to build a new scientific station on the archipelago. Construction began on July 24, 2007, and was completed on June 25, 2008. The new station was built with seismic isolation, and is considerably larger and better equipped than the previous one. The station is composed of a main building – equipped with reverse osmosis salt water desalination system, photovoltaics system and satellite communications system; deposits and a mooring dock.

The Brazilian Navy also maintains a lighthouse on the archipelago (ARLHS: SPP-001), built in 1995 to replace a previous one from 1930.

Air France Flight 447
On June 1, 2009, Air France Flight 447, an Airbus A330-200 jetliner en route from Rio de Janeiro to Paris with 228 persons on board, crashed in the Atlantic Ocean relatively close to the Saint Peter and Saint Paul Archipelago, killing all its occupants. Bodies and fragments from the aircraft were found just to the northwest of the archipelago.

Geography
The archipelago is composed of several rocks, five small rocky islets and four larger islets:

Belmonte Islet: 
Challenger Islet (also known as São Paulo): 
Nordeste Islet (also known as São Pedro): 
Cabral Islet: 
South Islet: .

None of the islets have a permanent fresh water supply available.

Biology
Only the largest of the islets, Belmonte, is vegetated with mosses and grasses. The other rocks are mostly barren, except for some sea algae and fungi that can tolerate the salt spray. The rocks are inhabited by seabirds, including the brown booby (Sula leucogaster), brown noddy (Anous stolidus), and black noddy (Anous minutus), as well as crabs (Grapsus grapsus), insects, and spiders.

The islands are home to over 100 reef fishes, about 10% of which are found nowhere else in the world, including the extremely colorful Tosanoides aphrodite.

References

Further reading
 Andrade, F.G.G., Simões, L.S.A., Campos, T.F.C., Silva, A.J.C.A. 2007. Padrão estrutural da foliação milonígica do Arquipélago de São Pedro e São Paulo. Anais do 11º Simpósio Nacional de Estudos Tectônicos, 5th International Symposium of Tectonics of the SBG. Natal, 233. (in Portuguese)
 Beach, Edward L. November 1960 (Vol. 118, No. 5). "Triton Follows Magellan's Wake" National Geographic Magazine. 585-615
 Bonatti, E. 1990. Subcontinental mantle exposed in the Atlantic Ocean on St Peter-Paul islets. Nature, 345, 800–802.
 Campos, T.F.C., Virgens Neto, J., Amorim, V.A., Hartmann, L.A., Petta, R.A. 2003. Modificações metassomáticas das rochas milonitizadas do complexo ultramáfico do Arquipélago de São Pedro e São Paulo, Atlântico Equatorial. Geochimica Brasiliensis, 17–2, 81–90. (in Portuguese)
 Campos, T.F.C., Virgens Neto, J., Costa, L.S., Petta, R.A., Sousa, L.C., Silva, F.O. 2007. Sistema de diaclasamento do Arquipélago de São Pedro e São Paulo (Atlântico Equatorial) como indicador de movimentação destral associado à falha transformante de São Paulo. Anais do 11º Simpósio Nacional de Estudos Tectônicos, 5th International Symposium of Tectonics of the SBG. Natal, 238. (in Portuguese)
 Hékinian, R., Juteau, T., Gracia, E., Udintsev, G., Sichler, B., Sichel, S.E., Apprioual, R. 2000. Submersible observations of Equatorial Atlantic Mantle: The St. Paul Frature Zone region. Marine Geophysical Research, 21, 529–560.
 Melson, W.G., Jarosewich, E., Bowen, V.T., Thompsonm G. 1967. St. Peter and St. Paul rocks: a high-temperature mentle-derived intrusion. Science, 155. 1532–1535.
 Moraes, J.F.S., Linden, E.M., Moraes, F.A.B. 1997. Planta topográfica do Arquipélago de São Pedro e São Paulo, escala 1:500. CPRM – Serviço Geológico do Brasil.
 Motoki, A., Sichel, S.E., Campos, T.F.C., Srivastava, N.K., Soares, R.S. 2009. Taxa de soerguimento atual do Arquipélago de São Pedro e São Paulo, Oceano Atlântico Equatorial. Revista Escola de Minas, 62–3. 331–342. (in Portuguese)
 
 Sichel, S.E., Esperança, S., Motoki, A., Maia, M., Horan, M.F., Szatmari, P., Alves, E.C., Mello, S.L.M. 2008. Geophysical and geochemical evidence for cold upper mantle beneath the Equatorial Atlantic Ocean. Revista Brasileira de Geofísica, 26–1, 69–86.
Souza, José Eduardo Borges de: O arquipélago de São Pedro e São Paulo, Rio de Janeiro, Revista do Clube Naval, Ano 115, N° 340, Out/Nov/Dez 2006. p. 70-72, ISSN 0102-0382.
Thompson, Geoffrey: St. Peter and St. Paul's Rocks (Equatorial Atlantic) and the Surrounding Sea Floor, Woods Hole, Woods Hole Oceanographic Institution, 1981 (Technical Report) (Woods Hole Oceanog. Inst. Tech. Rept. WHOI-81 -98) 
Tressler, Willis L.: Rochedos São Pedro e São Paulo (St. Peter and St. Paul Rocks), Washington, U. S. Navy Hydrographic Office, 1956 (Technical Report, TR-31).
 Virgens Neto, J., Campos, T.F.C. 2007. A influência da zona de fratura São Paulo no contexto estrutural do Arquipélago de São Pedro e São Paulo – Atlântico Equatorial. Anais do 11º. Simpósio Nacional de Estudos Tectônicos, 5th International Symposium of Tectonics of the SBG. Natal, 294–295. (in Portuguese)
 Wiseman, J. D. H. 1966. St Paul's Rocks and the Problem of the Upper Mantle. Geophysical Journal of the Royal Astronomical Society, 11, 519–525. (in Portuguese)

External links

 Official website 
 A New Era on the Archipelago of Saint Peter and Saint Paul Brazilian Navy publication
 
 Information and pictures from landing, February 2001
 Darwin's description from Voyage of the Beagle
First Visit of Brazilian Research Vessel
 Penedos de Sao Pedro e São Paulo 

Landforms of Pernambuco
Ecoregions of Brazil
Archipelagoes of Brazil
Deserts and xeric shrublands
Neotropical ecoregions
Archipelagoes of the Atlantic Ocean
Islands of the South Atlantic Ocean
Mid-Atlantic Ridge
Archipelago